The Intelligence Branch is a personnel branch of the Canadian Forces (CF) that is concerned with providing relevant and correct information to enable commanders to make decisions.

The branch works in a variety of challenging positions, at home and abroad, meeting the needs of commanders and operational planners of the Canadian Forces at all levels and in all environments. Since the branch's inception, members have deployed overseas to Bosnia and Herzegovina, Haiti, Somalia, Rwanda, Timor-Leste, Latvia, Ukraine, Mali, Kuwait, Afghanistan, and Iraq. Branch members have also deployed domestically on a number of operations. These include tasks related to the ice storms in Quebec, floods in Winnipeg, fires in British Columbia and the Canadian military's response to the COVID-19 pandemic.

History 

The first intelligence guides unit in Canada was the "4th Troop of Volunteer Cavalry of Montreal (or Guides)", formed on 7 February 1862. Renamed "The Royal Guides or Governor General's Body Guard for Lower Canada", and later "The Guides", the unit was disbanded in 1869 after helping to repel Fenian raiders.

During the North-West Rebellion (1885), various irregular cavalry units were used as scouts. One of these scout units, drawn from the Dominion Land Survey, was called the "Intelligence Corps". With a strength of three officers and 30 men performing long-range reconnaissance and light cavalry functions, it was the first unit to be designated an intelligence unit in the British Empire. These scout units, the forerunners of the Fort Garry Horse and North Saskatchewan Regiment, were disbanded by 18 September 1885.

During the Boer War in South Africa, Canadian mounted troops gathered information of intelligence value with Strathcona's Horse and British scout units. Canadian intelligence efforts in South Africa led to the appointment on 6 February 1901 of Lieutenant-Colonel Victor Brereton Rivers, RCA, as the first intelligence staff officer of the Canadian Militia. Shortly after, on 1 April 1903, the Corps of Guides was created in the Canadian Militia. Under the new structure, a district intelligence officer responsible to director general of military intelligence (DGMI) was appointed to oversee Corps of Guides units established in each of Canada's 12 military districts. The first DGMI, Lieutenant-Colonel W.A.C. Denny, had a very small staff overseeing information collection and mapping, and approximately 185 militia officers serving the Canadian Corps of Guides.

By 1914, the Canadian Corps of Guides totalled some 500 all ranks. Given that their mounted scout role appeared inappropriate for war in Europe, many of the personnel serving with the Corps of Guides were absorbed into existing units and formations in the Canadian Militia and Canadian Expeditionary Force. Others became intelligence staff officers and non-commissioned officers serving with the British Intelligence Corps. Some continued to serve in Canada with the Canadian Corps of Guides. The intelligence system created within the First Canadian Division prior to its deployment to France in 1915 served as the basis for the development of intelligence structures generally throughout the Canadian Corps.

After the war, a position for a director of military operations and intelligence was maintained in the Canadian Militia. Corps of Guides units in Canada were converted to cyclist companies charged with protecting the main force form surprise during time of war. After disbandment of these companies on 31 March 1929, a small staff in Ottawa and some districts performed intelligence duties. In 1932, intelligence staffs of the Royal Canadian Air Force and Militia were amalgamated.

When Canada mobilized in September 1939, intelligence structures based on British organizations were rapidly developed and intelligence analysts were given new challenges. As of 16 December 1940, there were about 60 all ranks posted to Canadian intelligence duties. Foreseeing the need for 200 intelligence personnel, Major John Page proposed that field security (FS) functions be separated from the Canadian Provost Corps. Moreover, he worked to have an Intelligence Corps, formed in a manner similar to that of the British Intelligence Corps formed on 25 June 1940, recognized.

Establishment of the First Canadian Army in April 1942 led to a tremendous demand for intelligence specialists, and on 29 October 1942 the Canadian Intelligence Corps (C Int C) was officially recognized as a corps. Canadians from universities, colleges, businesses and industries joined the C Int C to participate in a great variety of intelligence duties; a number became casualties at the Dieppe Raid, in Northwest Europe and the Adriatic. Army Intelligence sections or staffs were represented at army, corps, division, and district levels, with seven field security sections in existence as well. By 1943, for the first time in Canadian history, Canadian personnel filled all intelligence appointments within Canada's Army formations and units.

In 1948, the Canadian Militia was authorized six intelligence training companies: No. 1 in Montreal, No. 2 in Toronto, No. 3 in Halifax, No. 4 in Vancouver, No. 5 in Winnipeg, and No. 6 in Edmonton. The basic aim of these companies was to provide a pool of trained intelligence personnel to augment the Regular Force when needed.

During the 1950s and 1960s, members of the C Int C were engaged in a variety of intelligence duties in Canada, Germany, the United Kingdom, the United States and Cyprus. Following unification of the Canadian Forces in the late 1960s, the C Int C, the clerk-intelligence trade, the Canadian Provost Corps, and the Air Force Police were united to become the CF Security Branch, and the Canadian Forces School of Intelligence and Security (CFSIS) was formed.

In 1981, the CF Security Branch was divided into two separate branches: one for intelligence and the other for security. Sir William Stephenson ("A Man Called Intrepid") accepted the appointment as first colonel commandant of the Intelligence Branch, which was formed 1 October 1982. The actual re-badging occurred on 29 October 1982, the 40th anniversary of the birth of the C Int C.

In 2000, a further split with the Security Branch occurred, with intelligence training moving from CFSIS at CFB Borden to the newly formed Canadian Forces School of Military Intelligence (CFSMI) at CFB Kingston. This ended the formal affiliation of the Intelligence Branch with the former CFSIS.

Branch cap badge 

When the Intelligence Branch was formed on 1 October 1982 the branch had a new badge. The colours scarlet, dark green and white denote the evolution of the branch from the Canadian Corps of Guides, the Canadian Intelligence Corps, and the Canadian Forces Security Branch, respectively. The North Star symbol embodied in the Canadian Intelligence Corps badge is also found in the branch badge, further preserving historic ties. The compass rose shape of the badge draws notice to the worldwide scope of branch responsibilities.

Branch today 
The Canadian Forces School of Military Intelligence (CFSMI) in Kingston, Ontario, is the home of intelligence training for the Army, Navy and Air Force. Identical training is provided to both Regular Force and Reserve members. The CFSMI mission is to provide core and specialist intelligence training to officers and non-commissioned members of the Intelligence Branch and other military branches.

Army reservists, employed at 6 Intelligence Company (Edmonton, Vancouver and Winnipeg), 2 Intelligence Company (Toronto) and 7 Intelligence Company (Ottawa), 4 Intelligence Company (platoons in Montreal and Quebec City), 3 Intelligence Company (Halifax, Nova Scotia), make an important contribution to the Intelligence Branch for overseas deployments. As a result, individual movement between Regular and Reserve components is relatively fluid compared with other branches in the CAF.

In 2017, the title Canadian Intelligence Corps was restored for Intelligence Branch members who wear army uniform. Prior to this, the shoulder titles on army uniforms (navy and air force uniforms do not use shoulder titles) in English was INT and in French .

See also 

 Signals Intelligence
 Canadian Security Intelligence Service
 Communications Security Establishment
 RCMP Security Service
 Royal Canadian Mounted Police

References

External links 
 Canadian Military Intelligence Association

Canadian Armed Forces personnel branches
Organizations based in Canada with royal patronage
Military intelligence agencies
Canadian intelligence agencies